Bahçelievler is a rapid transit station on the M1 line of the Istanbul Metro located in southeastern Bahçelievler. Connection to the Istanbul Metrobus is available.

Bahçelievler was opened on 15 January 1999.

Layout

References

Istanbul metro stations
Railway stations opened in 1999
Bahçelievler
1999 establishments in Turkey